Bohuňov is a municipality and village in Žďár nad Sázavou District in the Vysočina Region of the Czech Republic. It has about 300 inhabitants.

Administrative parts
The village of Janovičky is an administrative part of Bohuňov.

References

Villages in Žďár nad Sázavou District